Dionysious may refer to:

Pulikkottil Joseph Mar Dionysious II, Metropolitan in the Malankara church
Pulikkottil Joseph Mar Dionysious I (Mar Thoma X), Metropolitan in the Malankara church
Punnathara Mar Dionysious (Mar Thoma XI), Malankara Metropolitan from 1817 to 1825

See also
Dionysius (disambiguation)
Dionysos (disambiguation)